CD96 (Cluster of Differentiation 96) or Tactile (T cell activation, increased late expression)  is a protein that in humans is encoded by the CD96 gene. CD96 is a receptor protein which is expressed on T cells and NK cells and shares sequence similarity with CD226 (also known as DNAM-1). The protein encoded by this gene belongs to the immunoglobulin superfamily. It is a type I membrane protein. The protein may play a role in the adhesion of activated T and NK cells to their target cells during the late phase of the immune response. It may also function in antigen presentation. Alternative splicing occurs at this locus and two transcript variants encoding distinct isoforms have been identified. CD96 is a transmembrane glycoprotein that has three extracellular immunoglobulin-like domains and is expressed by all resting human and mouse NK cells. CD96 main ligand is CD155. CD 96 has approximately 20% homology with CD226 and competed for binding to CD155 with CD226.

Function 

The protein encoded by this gene belongs to the immunoglobulin superfamily. It is a type I membrane protein. The protein may play a role in the adhesive interactions of activated T and NK cells during the late phase of the immune response. It may also function in antigen presentation. Alternative splicing generates multiple transcript variants encoding distinct isoforms. [provided by RefSeq, Jan 2016].

References

Further reading 

 
 
 
 
 
 
 
 
 

Clusters of differentiation